King del Rap is the third studio album by the Italian rapper Marracash, released on 31 October 2011 under Universal Music Group. It was also released in a deluxe version, including the street album Roccia Music II and several bonus tracks. The first single is the title track "King del Rap".

The album was certified gold by the Federation of the Italian Music Industry.

Track listing

Deluxe version bonus tracks 
The deluxe version of King del Rap includes a bonus CD with the street album Roccia Music II (nine tracks) and five bonus tracks.

Charts

References

2011 albums
Marracash albums